Blåsut metro station is a station on the green line of the Stockholm metro, located in Blåsut ("Blowout"), Johanneshov, Söderort. The station was on the first metro line (from Slussen south to Hökarängen) and opened on 1 October 1950.

References

Green line (Stockholm metro) stations
Railway stations opened in 1950
1950 establishments in Sweden